Weightlifting was part of the 1983 National Games of China held in Shanghai. Only men competed in ten bodyweight categories.

The competition program at the National Games mirrors that of the Olympic Games as only medals for the total achieved are awarded, but not for individual lifts in either the snatch or clean and jerk. Likewise an athlete failing to register a snatch result cannot advance to the clean and jerk.

Medal summary

Men

Medal table

References
Archived results of the 1983 Games 

1983 in weightlifting
1983 in Chinese sport
1983